The 14th Aerobic Gymnastics World Championships took place in Incheon, South Korea from June 17 to 19, 2016. The 7th World Age Group Competitions were held at the same place between June 13 and 15.

Event

Results

Women's Individual

Junior Women's Individual

Individual Men

Junior Individual Men

Trio and Group

References

2016 in gymnastics
2016 in South Korean sport
Aerobic Gymnastics World Championships
Sports competitions in Incheon
International gymnastics competitions hosted by South Korea